Betacellulin  is a protein that in humans is encoded by the BTC gene located on chromosome 4 at locus 4q13-q21. Betacellulin was initially identified as a mitogen. Betacellulin, is a part of an Epidermal Growth Factor (EGF) family and functions as a ligand for the epidermal growth factor receptor (EGFR). As the role a EGFR, betacellulin is manifested by different form of muscles and tissues, it also has a great effect of nitrogen that is used for retinal pigment epithelial cells and vascular smooth muscle cells. While many studies attest a role for betacellulin in the differentiation of pancreatic β-cells, the last decade witnessed the association of betacellulin with many additional biological processes, ranging from reproduction to the control of neural stem cells.  Betacellulin is a member of the EGF family of growth factors. It is synthesized primarily as a transmembrane precursor, which is then processed to mature molecule by proteolytic events.

Structure 
As shown on figure 1, the secondary structure of the human betacellulin-2 has 6% helical (1 helices; 3 residues) 36% beta sheet (5 strands; 18 residues). The mRNA of betacellulin contains six exons in which is 2816 base-pair long. The mRNA was translated into 178 amino acids, and different regions of the amino acid are responsible for different function. The first 31 amino acids are responsible for the signal peptide (Figure 2, exon 1), the 32nd to 118th amino acids are responsible for the extracellular region (Figure 2, exon 2 and 3), the 65-105 amino acids are responsible for the EGF-like domain (Figure 2, exon 3), the transmembrane domain is from amino acids 119-139 (Figure 2, exon 4), the cytoplasmic tail is from amino acid 140-178 (Figure 2, exon 5).

Function 

As a typical EGFR ligand, betacellulin is expressed by a variety of cell types and tissues, the post-translation of the betacellulin can ectodomain shedding, and the proteolytic release the soluble factors can bind and activate the homodimer or heterodimer of the ERBB receptors. The membrane-anchored form of the betacellulin can activate the epidermal growth factor receptor (EGFR).

Betacellulin stimulates the proliferation of retinal pigment epithelial and vascular smooth muscle cells but did not stimulate the growth of several other cell types, such as endothelial cells and fetal lung fibroblasts.

Tissue distribution 
The mRNA coding for betacellulin was found to be slightly higher compared in the rat sciatic nerve segment after nerve damage, suggesting that betacellulin can play a role in peripheral nerve regeneration. Immunohistochemistry has been used to look for betacellulin expression in Schwann cells. Treating cells with betacellulin recombinant protein can be used to investigate the role of betacellulin in managing Schwann cells. A co-culture assay can also used to assess the effect of Schwann cell-secreted betacellulin on neurons.

Mouse BTC is expressed as a 178-amino acid precursor. The membrane-bound precursor is cleaved to yield mature secreted mouse BTC. BTC is synthesized in a wide range of adult tissues and in many cultured cells, including smooth muscle cells and epithelial cells. The amino acid sequence of mature mouse BTC is 82.5%, identical with that of human BTC, and both exhibit significant overall similarity with other members of the EGF family.

Clinical significance

Therapy resistance 
This caused the therapy resistance in glioblastoma (GBM). The transcription factor signal transducer and activator of transcription 3 (STAT3) was identified as the therapeutic target for glioblastoma. However, inhibition of STAT3 induces the production of betacellulin in which will bind and activate EGFR. As results, nuclear factor-kappaB (NF-κB), a major mediator of resistance in GBM, is also activated. Inhibition of STAT3 and betacellulin results in apoptosis in glioblastoma cells. This indicates that BTC has a role in regulation of tumor cell growth.

Ovarian cancer cell migration 
The ability to bind and activate the homodimer or heterodimer of the ERBB receptors may give some special properties to BTC. This was presented in the study of betacellulin in ovarian cancer progression. Activation of EGFR up-regulating the Cx43 that is relating to the development and migration of ovarian cancer. Betacellulin is responsible for binding and activating the EGFR which means betacellulin up-regulates Cx43 expression and cell migration. Betacellulin increased Connexin43 expression and increased cell migration in two human ovarian cancer cell line (OVCAR4 and SKOV3.) This was also observed in Zhao's study. The difference is that betacellulin helps cancer cell migration by down-regulated E-cadherin, and this results in increasing cell migration in OVCAR5 and SKOV3 human ovarian cancer cell line.

Regulation in osteoblasts 
Osteoblasts, which are responsible for forming and mineralizing osteoid, express EGFRs and alter rates of proliferation and differentiation in response to EGF receptor activation. Transgenic mice over-expressing the EGF-like ligand betacellulin (BTC) exhibit increased cortical bone deposition; however , because the transgene is ubiquitously expressed in these mice, the identity of cells affected by BTC and responsible for increased cortical bone thickness remains unknown. BTC decreases the expression of osteogenic markers in both MSCs (mesenchymal stem cell) and pre-osteoblasts increases in proliferation require hypoxia-inducible factor-alpha (HIF-alpha), as an HIF antagonist prevents BTC-driven proliferation. Both MSCs and pre-osteoblasts express EGF receptors ErbB1, ErbB2, and ErbB3, with no change in expression under osteogenic differentiation. These are the first data that demonstrate an influence of BTC upon MSCs and the first to implicate HIF-alpha in BTC-mediated proliferation.

References

Further reading

External links 
 

Genes on human chromosome 4
Growth factors